Yatra is pilgrimage or procession in Hinduism. Yatra may also refer to:

People 
 Sebastián Yatra, Colombian singer

Companies 

 Yatra (company), travel website

Films, TV, and music 
 Yathra, 1985 Indian Malayalam-language film starring Mammootty
 Yatra (1986 TV series), 1986 Indian travel-based television series
 Yatra (album), 1994 album by Indian-American saxophonist Rudresh Mahanthappa
 Yatra (2002 TV program), 2002 Indian Hindi-language religious travel television program
 Yatra (2006 film), 2006 Indian Hindi-language film directed by Gautam Ghose
 Yatra (2019 film), 2019 Indian Telugu-language biopic about Y. S. Rajasekhara Reddy

Places 

 Yatra, Navahrudak District, a village in Navahrudak District, Belarus

See also
 Dhanu Yatra, theatre performance in Odisha, India
 Jatra (disambiguation)
 Zatra
 Yadaya, a Burmese magical ritual used to avert misfortune